The 8th ALMA Awards honors the accomplishments made by Latinos in film and television in 2005.

Winners
Outstanding Actor in a Motion Picture
Michael Peña - Crash

Outstanding Actress in a Motion Picture
Q'Orianka Kilcher - The New World

Outstanding Supporting Actress in a Motion Picture
Elpidia Carrillo - Nine Lives

Outstanding Director of a Motion Picture
Fernando Meirelles - The Constant Gardener

Outstanding Actor in a Television Series
Jimmy Smits - The West Wing

Outstanding Actress in a Television Series
Judy Reyes - Scrubs

Outstanding Television Series
The West Wing (NBC)

Outstanding Supporting Actor in a Television Series
Jorge Garcia - Lost

Outstanding Supporting Actress in a Television Series
 Michelle Rodriguez - Lost

Outstanding Performance in a Daytime Drama
Eva La Rue - All My Children

Outstanding Director of a Television Drama or Comedy
 Jesús Treviño - Prison Break (FOX)

Outstanding Script for a Television Drama or Comedy
 Law & Order: Special Victims Unit for "Alien"
Jose Molina (NBC)

Outstanding Male Musical Performer
 Daddy Yankee

Outstanding Female Musical Performer
 Shakira

Spanish Album of the Year
 Fijación Oral Vol. 1 by Shakira

Person of the Year
 Eva Longoria

Anthony Quinn Award for Excellence in Motion Pictures
 Andy García

Celia Cruz Award for Excellence in Music
 Marc Anthony

Special Achievement for Children's Programming
 Maya & Miguel

Special Achievement in Diversity Programming
ABC

ALMA
008
ALMA
ALMA
ALMA
ALMA